The Prince of Lu of the Southern Ming dynasty, resisting the invading Qing dynasty forces, fled to Kinmen (Quemoy) in 1651. In 1663, Kinmen was seized by Qing forces.

The mainland Chinese city of Xiamen is within shelling distance of the small islands of Kinmen.  As one of the front line islands between the Republic of China (ROC) and the People's Republic of China (PRC). ROC-governed Kinmen has seen many battles and tensions between the two throughout the Cold War. It was generally understood by both the ROC and the PRC that if Kinmen fell to the PRC, Taiwan itself would follow.

The phrase "Quemoy and Matsu" became part of U.S. politics in the 1960 Presidential election. During the debates, both candidates, Richard Nixon and John F. Kennedy pledged to use U.S. force if necessary to protect the ROC from invasion from the Chinese mainland by the PRC, which the U.S. did not recognize as a legitimate government at the time. Vice-president Nixon charged that Senator Kennedy would not use U.S. force to protect Taiwan's forward positions, Kinmen and Matsu.

List of battles over Kinmen:
Battle of Guningtou (1949)
On July 26, 1950, ROC forces on Dadan Island (Tatan), in total 298 soldiers, repulsed an attack (大擔島戰役) from a People's Liberation Army force of 700 soldiers that landed on the island.
First Taiwan Strait Crisis (1954-1955)
Second Taiwan Strait Crisis (1958)

After the Second Taiwan Strait Crisis ended in stalemate, both sides settled upon a routine of bombarding each other every other day with shells containing propaganda leaflets. ROC troops on the island continued constructing tunnels, bunkers, and other underground facilities. Commandos (often known as 水鬼, or "water ghosts" by ROC troops) were sent by both sides to conduct sabotage or attack lone sentries. The bombardment finally ended in 1979 with the establishment of formal diplomatic ties between the United States and the PRC.

See also
Chinese Civil War
Political status of Taiwan
Third Taiwan Strait Crisis

References

External links
Kinmen National Park
GlobalSecurity.org page on Taiwan
ROC Ministry of National Defense: War History (in Chinese)
PRC Government portal (in Chinese)
ROC Tourism Bureau article on Kuningtou (in Chinese)
United Daily News article (in Chinese)

Military history of the Republic of China (1912–1949)
Kinmen
Battles in Kinmen